The Jvari inscriptions are the Old Georgian inscriptions written in the Georgian Asomtavruli script on the Jvari Monastery, a basilica located near Mtskheta, Georgia. Per Professor Wachtang Djobadze, inscriptions mention Georgian princes Stephen I of Iberia, Demetrius the Hypatos and Adarnase I of Iberia, however, Professor Cyril Toumanoff disagrees with this view and identifies these individuals with Stephen II of Iberia, Demetrius and Adarnase II of Iberia, respectively. Inscriptions are dated to the late sixth-early seventh centuries.

Inscriptions

Inscription 1
Ⴍ ႫႠႺ
ႭႥႰႨႱႠ
Ⴍ ႱႲႤႴႠႬႭ
Ⴑ ႵႠႰႧႪႨႱ
Ⴀ ႮႠႲႰႨ
ႩႨႭႱႨ ႸႤ
Translation: "Cross of Our Savior, have mercy on Stephanoz, the patrikios of Kartli."

Inscription 2
ႼႭ
ႫႵ Ⴊ Ⴋ
ႧႠႥႠႰႠႬႢႤႪႭႦႭ
ႣႤႫႤႲႰ
ႤႱ ჃႮႠ
ႲႭႱႱ
Ⴀ ႫႤႭ
Ⴞ ႾႤႷ
ႠႥ
Translation: "Holy Michael Archangel, have mercy on Demetre the hypatos."

Inscription 3
ႼႭ ႢႰႪ
ႫႧႠႥ
ႠႬႢႤႪႭ
Ⴍ ႠႣႰ
ႰႱႤႱ ჃႮႠႲ
ႭႱႱႠ ႫႤႭႾ
ႤႷႠႥ
Translation: "Holy Grigol Archangel, have mercy on Adarnase the hypatos."

Inscription 4
ႼႭ ႱႲႤ
ႵႭႡႳႪ
ႱႲႨ
ႸႤ
Translation: "Holy Stephen, have mercy on Kobul Stephanoz."

See also
Bir el Qutt inscriptions
Bolnisi inscriptions

References

Bibliography
Epigraphic Corpus of Georgia (ECG) Project, Institute of Linguistic Studies, Ilia State University
Rapp, Stephen H. (2014) The Sasanian World Through Georgian Eyes, Caucasia and the Iranian Commonwealth in Late Antique Georgian Literature, Routledge, 
Georgian inscriptions
Archaeological artifacts
6th-century inscriptions
7th-century inscriptions
Mtskheta